Douna is a town in southwestern Burkina Faso. It is near the city of Bobo-Dioulasso.

References

Populated places in the Cascades Region